The Guam national badminton team represents Guam, an organized, unincorporated territory of the United States in the Micronesia subregion of the western Pacific Ocean, in international badminton team competitions.

Participation in BWF competitions

Sudirman Cup

Participation in Oceania Badminton Championships

Women's team

Mixed team

Participation in Pacific Mini Games
Mixed team

Current squad 
The following player selected were to represent Guam in the 2023 Victor Oceania New Zealand Games.

Male players
Johnson Xia
Derrick Yan
Jacob Paredes

Female players
Frederika Herman
Offeia Yordy
Danielle Snaer

References

Badminton
National badminton teams
Badminton in Guam